Douglas Cambridge (22 August 1941 – 3 September 2005) was a Vincentian cricketer. He played in two first-class matches for the Windward Islands in 1968/69.

See also
 List of Windward Islands first-class cricketers

References

External links
 

1941 births
2005 deaths
Saint Vincent and the Grenadines cricketers
Windward Islands cricketers